Miss World Philippines is a beauty pageant in the Philippines that selects the country's representatives to the Miss World, one of the Big Four international beauty pageants.

The pageant also selects four other representatives to participate in minor international pageants such as Miss Supranational, Reina Hispanoamericana, and Miss Eco International. In addition the organizer of the pageant also held its male counterpart Mister World Philippines to pick representatives to participate in Mister World, and Mister Supranational.

The pageant is inspired by the Miss World Ltd.'s slogan "Beauty with a Purpose" and henceforth adopted the theme "Beauty in Giving."

The winner and her court work with charities that benefit children in need and also join movements of supporting women and children's rights and many more advocacies.

History
The pageant was officially launched on March 23, 2011, at the SMDC Showroom at the SM Mall of Asia.

Quirino resigned as the national director on January 15, 2017, due to personal and business reasons. A day later, Arnold Vegafria, who served as the talent manager of Miss World 2013 Megan Young, took over the position after he met with Morley. Under Vegafria's term, seven additional minor international beauty pageant titles are awarded namely: Miss Supranational Philippines, Miss Eco Philippines, Miss Multinational Philippines,  Reina Hispanoamericana – Filipinas, Miss Philippines Tourism, Miss Eco Teen Philippines and Miss Environment Philippines for which they will represent the Philippines internationally.

Prior to Miss World Philippines, the title was awarded through the Miss Republic of the Philippines pageant from 1966 to 1976, then by Mutya ng Pilipinas, Inc. through Mutya ng Pilipinas pageant from 1977 to 1991, and Binibining Pilipinas Charities, Inc. through the Binibining Pilipinas pageant from 1992 to 2010.

Titles 
Note that the year designates the time Miss World Philippines Organization has acquired that particular pageant franchise.

Editions 
Below is the complete list of Miss World Philippines editions.

Titleholders

See also
Big Four international beauty pageants
Philippines at major beauty pageants
List of beauty contests

References

External links
 Official website

 
Philippines
Philippines
Philippines
Recurring events established in 2011
2011 establishments in the Philippines
Philippine awards